Emmanuelle 7: The Meaning of Love is a 1994 television movie, which was the seventh episode from the erotic series Emmanuelle in Space. It was directed by Brody Hooper, produced by Alain Siritzky, and written by Thomas McKelvey Cleaver, based on character by Emmanuelle Arsan.

Cast
 Krista Allen as Emmanuelle
 Paul Michael Robinson as Captain Haffron Williams
 Tiendra Demian as Tasha
 Brad Nick'ell
 Kimberly Rowe as Angie
 Timothy Di Pri
 Lori Morrissey as Jay
 Holly Hollywood as Gee
 Reginald Chevalier
 Lee McHugh

References

External links
 
 

1994 television films
1994 films
American television films
Emmanuelle in Space
1990s French films